Marta Aberturas Rubio (5 July 1974) is a former Spanish rhythmic gymnast, world group champion in  Athens 1991, in addition to achieving numerous other medals with the Spanish national rhythmic gymnastics team. The generation of gymnasts that she joined is known by the pseudonym of the First Golden Girls.

Personal life 
Aberturas was born in Gijón in 1974, but moved to Zaragoza in 1981. She started in rhythmic gymnastics at the Club Escuela de Gimnasia Rítmica de Zaragoza. In August 1988 she was summoned by Emilia Boneva to enter the national team national rhythmic gymnastics group of Spain, of which she would become a part until 1991.

Career 
During the time in which she was a member of the group, she would train about 8 hours a day at the Moscardó Gymnasium in Madrid under the orders of Emilia Boneva herself and Ana Roncero, who since 1982 had been the national team coaches, and would live with all the members of the team in a house in La Moraleja. She was a substitute gymnast for the team in most of the competitions of that time, although she would start in some exhibitions in Spanish cities during the preseason and in international tournaments such as Karlsruhe.

At the beginning of 1989 she won 3 silvers in the DTB-Pokal Karlsruhe tournament. Shortly thereafter, as a substitute gymnast, she won 3 bronze medals at the Sarajevo World Championships, reaching the podium in both the All-Around and the 12 clubs and 3 hoops + 3 ribbons finals. She would achieve them together with Beatriz Barral, Lorea Elso, Bito Fuster, Arancha Marty, Mari Carmen Moreno and Vanesa Muñiz, Nuria Arias also being a substitute. In December 1989, again as a substitute, she won bronze in the general Wacoal Cup, Japan.

In April 1990, she participated as headline in an exhibition of the group on the occasion of the inauguration of the Príncipe Felipe Pavilion in Zaragoza. Again as a substitute for the team, she was summoned to the European Championships in Goteborg, in which she won the bronze medal in both the All-Around and with 3 balls + 3 ropes, and silver with 12 clubs. At the World Cup's final in Brussels, she won 3 bronze medals, one for each final. They would be achieved together with Beatriz Barral, Lorea Elso, Bito Fuster, Montse Martín, Arancha Marty and Vanesa Muñiz, with Gemma Royo also being a substitute. Débora Alonso and Cristina Chapuli were also part of the team, but were not called up for competitions that year. In the Wacoal Cup tournament in Tokyo, held in November, they achieved silver overall.

In 1991, the two groups exercises were the 6 ribbons and the 3 balls + 3 ropes. The first had "Tango Jalousie" as music, composed by Jacob Gade, while the one with balls and ribbons used the song "Campanas", by Víctor Bombi. To choreograph the dance steps of the 6 ribbons exercise, they had the help of Javier Castillo "Poty", then a dancer of the National Ballet, although the team's usual choreographer was the Bulgarian Georgi Neykov. Prior to the World Cup, they won gold at the Karlsruhe tournament (ahead of the USSR and Bulgaria) and 3 bronzes at the Gymnastic Masters in Stuttgart, both in Germany.

Throughout the year 1991 she was a substitute gymnast for the group. On October 12 of that year, the Spanish group won the gold medal in the All-Around of the World Championship in Athens. This triumph was described by the media as historic, since it was the first time that Spain was proclaimed world champion in rhythmic gymnastics. On the first day of the All-Around they had achieved a score of 19,500 in the exercise with 3 balls and 3 ropes, while on the following day, with the staging of 6 ribbons, they obtained a mark of 19,350 (9.90 in composition and 9. 45 running). With a total score of 38,850, the Spanish team finally managed to beat the USSR by 50 thousandths, while North Korea won bronze. The next day, they would also be silver medalists in the two apparatus finals, the 6 ribbon, and the 3 balls and 3 ropes finals, although as in the rest of the competition, Marta would be a substitute gymnast in both exercises. These medals were achieved by Marta together with Débora Alonso, Lorea Elso, Bito Fuster, Isabel Gómez, Montse Martín and Gemma Royo, in addition to Cristina Chapuli as the other substitute. These medals would be narrated for Spain by the journalist Paloma del Río through La 2 de TVE. After this achievement, at the end of 1991 they would tour Switzerland.

She retired in 1991, after the World Championships in Athens. In 1992, she was awarded the Medal of Sports Merit from the Diputación General de Aragón along with his former teammate Gemma Royo. On December 16, 2017, Aberturas met with other former gymnasts from the national team to pay tribute to the former selector Ana Roncero. On November 16, 2019, on the occasion of the death of Emilia Boneva, some 70 former national gymnasts, including Marta, gathered on the mat to pay tribute to her during Euskalgym. The event took place before 8,500 attendees at the Bilbao Exhibition Center in Baracaldo and was followed by a tribute dinner in her honor.

Legacy and influence 
The national rhythmic gymnastics group of 1991 won the first world title for Spanish rhythmic gymnastics at the World Championships in Athens, achieving for the first time in this discipline a Western country prevailing over Eastern countries. It would also be the first Spanish women's team in proclaim himself world champion in a media sport. Reviews of this milestone appear in books such as Gimnasia rítmica deportiva: aspectos y evolución (1995) by Aurora Fernández del Valle, Enredando en la memoria (2015) by Paloma del Río or Pinceladas de rítmica (2017) by Montse and Manel Martín.

References 

1974 births
Living people
Spanish rhythmic gymnasts
Medalists at the Rhythmic Gymnastics European Championships
Medalists at the Rhythmic Gymnastics World Championships